Eli Thompson may refer to:

Lucky Thompson (1924–2005), American saxophonist
Eli Thompson (skydiver) (1973–2009), American skydiver
Eli Thompson (character), fictional character in Boardwalk Empire